Ashland is an unincorporated community in New Castle County, Delaware, United States. Ashland is located at the intersection of Delaware Route 82 and Barley Mill Road along the Red Clay Creek.

History
Ashland's population was 150 in 1890, and was 146 in 1900. 

The Ashland Covered Bridge was listed on the National Register of Historic Places in 1973.

References 

Unincorporated communities in New Castle County, Delaware
Unincorporated communities in Delaware